These are the known films of Harold Lloyd (1893–1971), an American actor and filmmaker most famous for his hugely successful and influential silent film comedies.

Most of these films are known to survive in Lloyd's personal archive collection and in various film archives around the world. Some are also available on DVD or Blu-ray. The negatives of many of Lloyd's early short films were lost in a fire at his estate in 1943. The losses include five of the six Willie Work films, 53 of the 67 Lonesome Luke films, and 15 of the 81 one-reel Glasses character films. All of Lloyd's films from Bumping into Broadway (1919) onward exist in complete form in the archives. He carefully preserved his feature films, and they remain in excellent condition. All of the films are listed in order of release date.

Early films

1913
In most of Lloyd's early films, he appeared as an uncredited extra or in a minor supporting role.

1914

1915

Willie Work

1915

Lonesome Luke

1915

1916

1917

Glasses character ("The Boy"): one-reel shorts

1917

1918

1919

Glasses character ("The Boy"): two-/three-reel shorts 

From this point onward, all of Lloyd's films exist in the archives.

1919

1920

1921

Later shorts

Dogs of War (1923), an Our Gang comedy filmed along with the feature film Why Worry?. Lloyd played himself.

Feature-length films
Lloyd starred in a total of 18 feature-length motion pictures, consisting of 11 silent and seven sound films. Lloyd also reedited his material into two compilation features.

Silent features

Sound features

Compilations

As producer only
Harold Lloyd's company Hollywood Productions made a series of short subject comedies starring Edward Everett Horton in 1927 and 1928. He also produced, but did not star in, two feature films.

References

Reilly, Adam (1977). Harold Lloyd – "The King of Daredevil Comedy". New York: Collier Books.
Schickel, Richard (1974). Harold Lloyd – The Shape of Laughter. Boston: New York Graphic Society.

American filmmakers
Male actor filmographies
20th-century American male actors
Filmography
American filmographies
Hal Roach Studios short film series